Ekrem Öztürk is a Turkish Greco-Roman wrestler. He is a member of İstanbul Büyükşehir Belediyesi S.K. He is a bronze medalist at the World Wrestling Championships and a two-time medalist at the European Wrestling Championships.

Career 

He won a bronze medal in the 55 kg event at both the 2018 European Wrestling Championships and the 2018 World Wrestling Championships. In 2019, he won one of the bronze medals in the 55 kg event at the World U23 Wrestling Championship in Budapest, Hungary.

In 2021, he won the silver medal in the 55 kg event at the European Wrestling Championships held in Warsaw, Poland. A few months later, he won the silver medal in his event at the 2021 Poland Open held in Warsaw, Poland.

In 2022, he won the silver medal in the 60 kg event at the Vehbi Emre & Hamit Kaplan Tournament held in Istanbul, Turkey.

Major results

References

External links 
 

Living people
Turkish male sport wrestlers
European Wrestling Championships medalists
World Wrestling Championships medalists
1997 births
People from Gaziantep
20th-century Turkish people
21st-century Turkish people